Major General Joseph Narh Adinkra is a Ghanaian military officer who served as Chief of Army Staff of the Ghana Army from 31 March 2009 to 4 April 2013.

Military career

In March 2009, Adinkra was appointed as Chief of the Army Staff in a total change in the army high command under President John Atta-Mills. Before his appointment as the Chief of the Army Staff, he was the General Officer Commanding of the Northern Command of the Ghana Army.

References

Living people
Alumni of the Accra Academy
Year of birth missing (living people)
Chiefs of Army Staff (Ghana)